Bertya ingramii, commonly known as the narrow-leaved bertya, is a shrub native to eastern Australia. It was one of eleven species selected for the Save a Species Walk campaign in April 2016; scientists walked 300 km to raise money for collection of seeds to be prepared and stored at the Australian PlantBank at the Australian Botanic Garden, Mount Annan.

References

ingramii
Flora of New South Wales
Plants described in 1988